The National Taitung University (NTTU) is a national university in Taitung City, Taitung County, Taiwan.

NTTU offers a range of undergraduate and graduate programs in fields such as Indigenous Studies, Environmental Studies, Agricultural Sciences, Engineering, Social Sciences, and Tourism Management.

History
NTTU was originally established in 1948 as Taiwan Provincial Taitung Teachers’ School. In 1969, it was upgraded to Taiwan Provincial Taitung Teachers’ Junior College, to Taiwan Provincial Taitung Teachers’ College in 1987 then to National Taitung Teachers’ College in 1991. Finally in 2003 it was upgraded to National Taitung University.

Colleges

 College of Humanities 
 Graduate Institute of Children's Literature
 Department of Somatics and Sport Leisure Industry
 Department of Chinese Language and Literature
 Department of Art Industry
 Department of Music
 English Department
 Department of Public and Cultural Affairs
 Language Center
 Teachers' College 
 Department of Education
 Department of Physical Education
 Department of Early Childhood Education
 Department of Special Education
 Department of Education Industry and Digital Media
 Department of Cultural Resources and Leisure Studies
 Bachelor's Program for Athletic Performance
 Special Education Center
 Science Education Center
 College of Science and Engineering
 Department of Applied Science
 Department of Applied Mathematics
 Department of Computer Science and Information Engineering
 Department of Information Science and Management Systems
 Department of Life Science
 Center for General Education
 Center for Teacher Education and Professional Advancement
 Center for Austronesian Culture

Library

The National Taitung University Library and Information Center is the current university library and was inaugurated on 8 December 2014.

Transportation
The main campus of the university is located north of the Zhiben Station of the Taiwan Railways. The Taitung City campus is located near the Taitung Station.

See also
 List of universities in Taiwan
 Huang Ching-ya,alumna

References

External links

 

 
Educational institutions established in 1948
1948 establishments in Taiwan
Universities and colleges in Taitung County
Technical universities and colleges in Taiwan